Greatfield Estate is a housing estate in the east of Kingston upon Hull, East Riding of Yorkshire. England,  built in the late 1950s.

Geography
Greatfield estate is located in the far south-east of Kingston upon Hull, close to the eastern boundary of the city, formed by the Old Fleet Drain. Annandale Road is the main road of the estate which bends, coming from the north-west and exiting to the west, connecting with Preston Road.

In 2007 the area was classed as an economically deprived area, with many residents in lower socioeconomic classes – people in the estate are predominately white British ethnically, with 93.1% classed as white.

History
Before the construction of the estate the land at 'Greatfield' was undeveloped -in 1850 it was enclosed drained fields with no roads – this situation continued until the estate's construction. The Hull and Holderness Railway which later bounded the estate to the south was constructed in the early 1850s. The Preston Road estate immediately to the west was under development  by the 1930s, and the nearby Eastern Cemetery came into use in 1931.

In the reconstruction period after the Second World War the Hull Corporation created several new housing estates in east Hull – these were Bilton Grange, Longhill and the Greatfield Estate. All were designed by Andrew Rankine, Hull's city architect as independent units, each with its own shops, schools, libraries and other civic facilities. Their design was in a reduced Festival of Britain style, with pantile roofed brick buildings, built along generally short curving roads with generous common open treed areas. Greatfield estate consisted of 823 houses.

Initially designed to create a near classless social structure, with a village or small town social structure, the estate was completed in 1960. The Anglican church of St Hilda was opened 1960, a subsidiary of the parish of Marfleet. A dedicated library for the estate was opened in 1963.  The Roman Catholic St Stephen's church opened in 1966. 

Other facilities around the estate in 1961 were numerous schools to cater for the post war baby boom. Primary level education was catered for by Ashwell Infants School and Ashwell Junior School (both off Ashwell Avenue), Oldfleet Infants School (off  Bradford Avenue), and Stockwell Infants School (off Dodswell Grove).  Changes in the City's educational framework in 1969 saw the two Ashwell Schools sharing the same site becoming a Junior High School (intake ages 9–13). Changes to demographics in the 1990–2000 period across the east of the city saw Ashwell JHS closed and was demolished in 2009, with the two remaining Infant Schools (Stockwell and Oldfleet) becoming County Primary Schools (intake ages 5–13). 

Greatfield Senior High School was established in 1957 on a tripartite educational system – it consisted of three halls: Newton Hall, a Technical school (600 places, intake ages 11–16); Elizabethan Hall, a secondary modern (450 places, intake 11–16); and Shakespeare Hall, a Grammar school (450 places). The original three schools were located adjacent to each other to the west of Greatfield Estate, located south of Preston Road and east of Poorhouse Lane. In 1969 the 11-plus was abandoned across the City and Newton and Elizabethan Hall merged into a Senior High school (intake ages 13–16), whilst Shakespeare became a new Junior High School (intake ages 9–13).  Local demographic changes saw the Shakespeare JHS closed in 1988 and soon after demolished, and a new discount supermarket (KwikSave) being built on the former school building site. The new (and current) Craven Park rugby ground was built on the school playing fields to the south of the former Shakespeare JHS site along Poorhouse Lane in the late 1980s, following the rugby club selling off its former ground on Holderness Road to the Co-operative supermarket chain. The Greatfield Senior High School (Newton Hall and Elizabethan Hall) were themselves demolished in early 2010's, although the new gym building was retained as a community facility. In 2014 construction began of a new special alternative provision academy school, "Aspire Academy", on the site of the Isaac Newton school. The school opened 2015.

The estate was served by three public houses, all Hull Brewery tied houses, The Lord Charles, on Annandale Road to the rear of the shopping parade, The Falcon, midway along Falkland Road, and The Goat and Compasses, at the southern end of Falkland Road before the railway line and footbridge  to Somerden Road and Hedon Road beyond.  The estate suffered through lack of employment in the later 20th century, though the estate is said to have retained a strong community spirit.
 
In 2015 local events were organised to celebrate 60 years of the estate's existence.

People
Mick Ronson, musician; a nearby road was named 'Ronson Close' after his death.
Lene Lovich, singer, lived on the estate as a teenager.
Paul Spencer Denman, musician, was raised on the estate.

Gallery

References

Sources

External links

Wards and districts of Kingston upon Hull
Housing estates in Kingston upon Hull